is a Japanese football player for FC Ryukyu.

Career
After four years in Meiji University's soccer team, Tanaka signed for Nagano Parceiro. Three years with the Northern-side brought Tanaka to FC Ryūkyū, where he inherited the captain's armband in 2016 after renewing his contract.

Club statistics
Updated to end of 2018 season.

References

External links
Profile at Mito HollyHock
Profile at FC Ryukyu

1989 births
Living people
Meiji University alumni
Association football people from Tokyo
Japanese footballers
J2 League players
J3 League players
Japan Football League players
AC Nagano Parceiro players
FC Ryukyu players
Mito HollyHock players
Association football midfielders